Rollie's Coaster is a steel sit-down roller coaster  on Mariners Landing Pier at Morey's Piers in Wildwood, New Jersey. Built in 1999 by the now defunct Pinfari to substitute for the older Zyklon rollercoaster which was on the pier since 1979, the track is colored orange and it seats four per car. The Rollies Coaster model is a different model than the original Zyklon. In the winter of 2009 the Rollies Coaster was moved backwards to make room for the new ghost ship. When they moved the Rollies Coaster backwards they also got a new station. Guests are required to give 7 tickets or have a wristband in order to ride.

The coaster was described by The Roller Coaster Lover's Companion as having a relatively mild ride experience (2 on a 5-point scale) and 3 out of 5 five stars for ride quality. The Philadelphia Inquirer similarly described the coaster as having a relatively mild ride experience upon its opening in 1999.

References

Roller coasters manufactured by Pinfari
Roller coasters in New Jersey
Tourist attractions in Cape May County, New Jersey
Roller coasters introduced in 1999
Morey's Piers